Leonardo Masu (10 May 1934 – 11 January 2010) was an Italian weightlifter.
He competed at the 1960 Summer Olympics in the middle-heavyweight class and finished in eighth place. He was born and died in Nuoro, Italy.

References

1934 births
2010 deaths
Olympic weightlifters of Italy
Weightlifters at the 1960 Summer Olympics
Italian male weightlifters
20th-century Italian people